The 1925–26 season was the 28th in the history of the Southern League. The league consisted of Eastern and Western Divisions. Millwall II won the Eastern Division and Plymouth Argyle II won the Western Division. Plymouth were declared Southern League champions after defeating Millwall 1–0 in a championship play-off.

No clubs from the Southern League applied to join the Football League, whilst four clubs left the league at the end of the season.

Eastern Division

A total of 18 teams contest the division, including 16 sides from previous season and two new teams.

Newly elected teams:
 Grays Thurrock United
 Fulham II

Western Division

The Western Division featured the same clubs as the previous season, minus the six clubs that had left.

References

1925-26
1925–26 in English football leagues
1925–26 in Welsh football